Escape to the Adriatic (German: Flucht an die Adria) is a 1937 Austrian-Czech drama film directed by Eugen Schulz-Breiden and starring Rolf Wanka, Willi Volker and Rózsi Csikós. In Germany it was released in 1939 under the title Sprung ins Glück.

It was shot at the Barrandov Studios in Prague. The film's sets were designed by the art director Gottlieb Hesch. A separate Czech version Irca's Romance was also released.

Cast
 Rolf Wanka  as Fred Bergen - Monteur 
 Willi Volker as Generaldirektor Bongardt 
 Rózsi Csikós as Friedl - seine Tochter 
 Tibor Halmay as Harry Peters - sein Neffe 
 Lizzi Holzschuh as Lolo - Harrys Freundin 
 Else Lord as Frau Schulz

References

Bibliography 
 Goble, Alan. The Complete Index to Literary Sources in Film. Walter de Gruyter, 1999.

External links 
 

1937 films
Czechoslovak drama films
Austrian drama films
1937 drama films
1930s German-language films
Films shot at Barrandov Studios
Austrian multilingual films
Austrian black-and-white films
Czechoslovak black-and-white films
Czechoslovak multilingual films
1937 multilingual films